Rosyth Dockyard  is a large naval dockyard on the Firth of Forth at Rosyth, Fife, Scotland, owned by Babcock Marine, which formerly undertook refitting of Royal Navy surface vessels and submarines. Before its privatisation in the 1990s it was formerly the Royal Naval Dockyard Rosyth. Its primary role now is the dismantling of decommissioned nuclear submarines.

History

Construction of the dockyard by civil engineers Easton, Gibb & Son commenced in 1909. At the time, the Royal Navy was strengthening its presence along the eastern seaboard of Great Britain due to a naval arms race with Germany.

First World War
 
In 1903 approval was given with an estimated cost of £3 million for "works" and £250,000 for machinery spread over 10 years. This was intended to be large enough for 11 battleships or 22 if doubled up.

The yard gained in size and importance during the First World War, with No. 6 Division of the Metropolitan Police set up to patrol it on 1 January 1916 (the Metropolitan Police then provided police for UK dockyards). The first ship to dry dock at Rosyth was the pre-dreadnought battleship  on 28 March 1916.

Interwar years
  as an ammunition store ship between October 1918 & 4 February 1920.
 HMS Crescent (1899) as a harbor depot ship between 1 May 1920 and 17 September 1921.
  as a minelayer between February 1918 and January 1919.

World War II

Privatisation

Babcock Thorn, a consortium operated by Babcock International and Thorn EMI, was awarded the management contract for Rosyth dockyard in 1987; with Rosyth Dockyard becoming a government owned, contractor run facility. This contract was awarded in parallel with Devonport Management Limited's contract to run Devonport Dockyard, Plymouth. In 1993 the Ministry of Defence announced plans to privatise Rosyth. Babcock International, who had bought out Thorn's share of the original Babcock Thorn consortium, was the only company to submit a bid and after protracted negotiations purchased the yard in January 1997.

Nuclear submarine refitting
In 1984 Rosyth was chosen as the sole location for refitting the Royal Navy's nuclear submarine fleet (a role it was already specialising in), and in 1986 extensive rebuilding commenced to facilitate this new role. However, in 1993, the government switched the refitting role to Devonport Dockyard.

Nuclear submarine decommissioning
Seven nuclear submarines were stored at Rosyth in 2007. In 2018, the Public Accounts Committee criticised the slow rate of decommissioning of these submarines, with the Ministry of Defence admitting that it had put off decommissioning due to the cost.

Queen Elizabeth class aircraft carriers
The Royal Navy's two  carriers were  constructed across six UK shipyards, with final assembly at Rosyth.

Today 
Today a Ministry of Defence site is based at the former dockyard, MoD Caledonia which holds a small naval garrison.  It is due to close by/in 2022.
Babcock currently building the type 31 frigates at rosyth.

Administration of the dockyard
The admiral-superintendent was the Royal Navy officer in command of a larger Naval Dockyard. The appointment of admiral-superintendents (or their junior equivalents) dates from 1832 when the Admiralty took charge of the Royal Dockyards. Prior to this larger dockyards were overseen by a commissioner who represented the Navy Board.

Admiral-Superintendent, Rosyth
Included:''
 Rear-Admiral Sir Henry H. Bruce: June 1915 – April 1920 
 Vice-Admiral Sir John F. E. Green: April 1920 – June 1923 
 Rear-Admiral Colin Cantlie: September 1939 – April 1944 
 Rear-Admiral Henry C. Bovell: April 1944 – April 1947 
 Vice-Admiral Sir Angus Cunninghame-Graham: April 1947 – August 1951 
 Rear-Admiral John H. F. Crombie: August 1951 – November 1953 
 Rear-Admiral Peter Skelton: November 1953 – September 1956 
 Rear-Admiral Peter D.H.R. Pelly: September 1956 – November 1957 
 Rear-Admiral Walter Evershed: November 1957 – September 1960 
 Rear-Admiral Ian G. Aylen: September 1960 – September 1963 
 Rear-Admiral John G. Watson: September 1963 – September 1966 
 Rear-Admiral William T.C. Ridley: September 1966 – September 1971

Port Admiral, Rosyth
 Rear-Admiral William T.C. Ridley: September 1971 – February 1972 
 Rear-Admiral Peter White: February 1972 – April 1974 
 Rear-Admiral Anthony J. Monk: April 1974 – January 1976 
 Rear-Admiral William T. Pillar: January 1976 – November 1977 
 Rear-Admiral John R.D. Nunn: November 1977 – January 1980 
 Rear-Admiral James E.C. Kennon: January 1980 – August 1981 
 Rear-Admiral John C. Warsop: August 1981 – August 1983 
 Vice-Admiral Robert R. Squires: August – December 1983

In the Royal Naval Dockyards, admiral-superintendents ceased to be appointed after 15 September 1971, and existing post-holders were renamed port admirals.

Note: These officers reported to the Flag Officer Scotland and Northern Ireland.

References

Bibliography

External links

 'Graveyard' fear as sub's hull is holed, Dunfermline Press, 3 April 2008

Ports and harbours of Scotland
Royal Navy bases in Scotland
Organisations based in Fife
Royal Navy submarine bases
Economy of Fife
1909 establishments in Scotland
Port cities and towns of the North Sea
Royal Navy dockyards
Rosyth